First League of Tuzla Canton is a fourth level league in the Bosnia and Herzegovina football league system. The league champion is promoted to the Second League of the Federation of Bosnia and Herzegovina - North.

Member clubs
List of clubs competing in 2020–21 season: 

 NK Čelić
 NK Doboj Istok
 NK Ingram
 FK Jedinstvo 1952
 NK Jedinstvo Lukavica
 FK Mladost 78
 NK Mladost-Brijesnica
 NK Mladost Gornje Živinice
 FK Mladost Kikači
 NK Mramor Babice
 NK Omladinac 68
 FK Polet Palanka
 NK Rijeka Šerići
 FK Sloga Tojšići
 NK Trešnjevka Maoča
 NK Vražići 92

References

4
Bos